La notte brava (internationally released as Bad Girls Don't Cry, The Big Night, Night Heat, and On Any Street) is a 1959 Italian drama film directed by Mauro Bolognini.  The film represents the debut of Tomas Milian in the Italian film industry.

Plot 

This movie is a socially conscious drama chronicling the exploits of three Roman thugs. The young men spend the day committing petty crimes, and culminate it in a rendezvous with three streetwalkers. After taking their pleasure, the men attempt to cheat the hookers out of their money, but the women outsmart them. That night, the guys return to the city for more exploits. By daybreak, they've all separated, with nothing but feelings of loneliness and disgust for their troubles.

In Caracalla, two Roman townsfolk, Scintillone and Ruggeretto, let two young prostitutes, Anna and Supplizia, get into the car, who were arguing over "area" reasons, in order to go unnoticed by the police as they try to place some stolen guns. Arriving at Mosciarella's house, they find him struggling with his sister's funeral and, not knowing what to do, they accept the proposal of the fence's nephew, Gino called er bella bella, who in exchange for a fee promises to free them of the goods.

But at that moment Gino's friend is in disgrace and the two girls, realizing why they have been loaded, suggest the three to go to Fiumicino where Frustoni the deaf mute, another fence, is located. Once at their destination, with the help of Nicoletta, another prostitute known by the other two, the deal is managed. Returning to Rome, the three couples stop along the country road and withdraw to "celebrate", but then the boys, once the fun is over, run away leaving the girls on foot and begin to argue about the sharing of money: that's when they realize that Anna, as suspicious as her colleagues, has stolen Scintillone's wallet. 

The three rush back but the girls have disappeared, not giving up, they go to Caracalla to look for information but the other prostitutes are reticent. Then, seeing a nice unattended car, they try to steal a radio left on the seat, but they are surprised by the owners, three guys from Roma well: Achille, known as Moretto, Pepito and a third companion. A fight begins, immediately interrupted by the arrival of the police, and the three boys take away the three townspeople apparently to get them out of trouble, but in fact to go to an isolated place where they can get satisfaction. 

Arrived at their destination, however, the group decides not to continue in the fight and to spend the evening together. After a passage in a bar, the six pass through the Caracalla area again where they meet Nicoletta: having found that she does not have the money and that Anna and Supplizia have abandoned her, they let off steam by throwing waste and water from certain vases on her flowers. Continuing in the evening, they donate blood in a mobile center and then all together go to Achilles' house to refresh themselves. The latter seems to show a certain sexual ambiguity, only hinted at previously in the caresses made to a boy in the meadow where the group had to fight, while Ruggero makes the "acquaintance" of Laura, a pretty blonde who at first passes herself off as the sister of Achille and then reveals that he works in the service of the rich home.  

Gino "calls to order" the other two, escaping after having stolen a wallet but, at the time of the division, intends to keep all the money, about 100,000 lire. For his part, Ruggero would like to bring back the stolen goods so as not to jeopardize the possibility of seeing Laura again. While Ruggero and Gino are fighting, Scintillone drives off in a taxi after taking possession of the wallet. Arrived in Torpignattara to look for Rossana, a girl courted in the past, he learns that now she too leads her life, encouraged by her boyfriend Eliseo, and finds her in a dance hall: Eliseo is there too, but the girl gets rid of her to go out. with Scintillone. They will go to an elegant restaurant near the Rupe Tarpea where, however, Scintillone will first be hunted in memory of certain precedents and then handed over to the police.  

Rossana collects the money left by Scintillone, but Ruggero comes to her and forces her to give him her swag, then invites her to join him to continue the evening together. The two move from one club to another until they arrive at a restaurant now closed, which is reopened thanks to a hefty tip given to the maître and the orchestra. There Ruggero confides in himself and makes people understand his will to change his life, also offering Rossana the prospect of a marriage, but he is faced with her cynicism. However, the evening ends in a romantic way, between long kisses in the taxi on the way back and a bouquet of wild roses, collected along the way. 

After a brief greeting, Ruggero remains alone in the taxi which takes him back to the township and spends the last money to pay for the ride. At the end of the "good night", he has only 1,000 lire left in his jacket pocket: as if to leave behind something that does not belong to him and that he no longer wants, Ruggero throws them smiling down a little bridge.

Cast 

 Laurent Terzieff: Ruggeretto
 Jean-Claude Brialy: Scintillone
 Franco Interlenghi: Gino aka Bella-Bella
 Tomas Milian: Achille
 Rosanna Schiaffino: Rossana
 Elsa Martinelli: Anna
 Anna Maria Ferrero: Nicoletta
 Antonella Lualdi: Supplizia
 Mylène Demongeot: Laura

Censorship 
When La Notte Brava was first released in Italy in 1959 the Committee for the Theatrical Review of the Italian Ministry of Cultural Heritage and Activities rated it as VM16: not suitable for children under 16. In addition, the committee imposed the removal of the following scenes: 1) the scene in which Anna, next to Scintillone, is displayed lying on the ground with her legs uncovered and indecently apart; 2) the scene in which Ruggeretto uncovers the maid who is lying in bed. As a consequence she shows her naked back all the way down to almost her gluteus which are covered only by light panties; 3) the scene in which Ruggeretto and the maid, hugging each other, roll on the ground; 4) the scene in which Ruggerretto and the maid are dancing, tightly hugged, and are engaging in a long, endless kiss. Age restriction was issued because of the embarrassing nature of the narration and because of the presence of several scenes considered to be inappropriate to the sensitivity of a minor.

References

External links

 

1959 films
Films directed by Mauro Bolognini
Italian drama films
1950s Italian films